Hisham Bizri ( is a film director, writer, producer, and scholar born in Beirut, Lebanon. Bizri started working in films in the US and Hungary with filmmakers Stan Brakhage, Raoul Ruiz, and Miklós Jancsó and has directed over 25 short films. His industry experience includes work as Producer at Future TV (Lebanon), Creative Director at Orbit Communications Company (Rome/Dubai/Beirut/Cairo), and President & Creative Director of Levantine Films (NYC). Bizri also has taught film for over two decades, most recently as Professor of Filmmaking and Screenwriting in the Literary Arts Department at Brown University. He previously taught at the University of Minnesota, MIT, UC Davis, NYU, Boston University, The School of the Museum of Fine Arts (Boston), and in Lebanon, Korea, Japan, Ireland, and Jordan (where he also initiated a number of academic film programs). His students have gone on to study film at NYU, USC, AFI, UCLA, La Fémis (Paris) and FAMU (Prague). In 2015, moved by the Syrian refugee crisis, Bizri returned to Jordan to partner with Jordan's Royal Film Commission in producing documentaries made by Arab filmmakers chronicling life in the Zaatari refugee camp and, in 2016, curating film programs for Syrian refugee children in Amman.

Early life

Bizri hails from a politically and financially prominent Levantine Arab clan—the El-Bizri—who ultimately trace their lineage to the Imam al-Husayn bin 'Ali. The family has included public servants, politicians,
and merchants since Ottoman times, with its political influence originally centered in Sidon and Damascus.

The youngest of seven children of Lebanese parents, Bizri was raised in Beirut during the Lebanese Civil War and 1982 Israeli Siege of Beirut. Bizri’s mother often would send him to the movie theater as an escape. The movie houses of Beirut introduced Bizri to classic Hollywood films by D.W. Griffith, John Ford, Howard Hawks, George Cukor, and Chaplin; the European films of Ingmar Bergman, F. W. Murnau, and Roberto Rossellini; and many avant garde works, as well.

Originally a student of physics and mathematics at American University in Beirut (AUB), Bizri found himself increasingly drawn to a career in film, eventually establishing a film club at AUB. Eager to obtain film training, the 19-year-old Bizri moved to Boston to study film at Boston University, from which he received his undergraduate degree, and completed post-graduate work at Harvard's Carpenter Center for the Arts and NYU's Tisch School before receiving his MFA from the University of Illinois
at Chicago.

Film career
Bizri's work has been shown in international venues including Sundance, Cannes, Berlin, Oberhausen (multiple times), Moscow, and Abu Dhabi film festivals as well as the Louvre, Institut du Monde Arabe, Cinémathèque Française, Centre Pompidou, MoMa, and Anthology Film Archives (NYC). He is recipient of awards from the McKnight, LEF, Jerome, and Rockefeller Foundations, as well as fellowships from the Guggenheim Foundation and American Academy in Rome, which awarded him the "Rome Prize" (FAAR 2009).

Early in his career, Bizri served as Producer at Future TV (Lebanon) and Creative Director of Orbit Communications Company (Rome/Dubai/Beirut/Cairo). In 2005, he co-founded The Arab Institute of Film (Amman, Jordan) with the Syrian filmmaker Omar Amiralay and Danish producer Jakob Høgel, with support from the Danish government, International Media Support (Denmark), and the Ford Foundation. In 2012, he was named President & Creative Director of Levantine Films (NYC).

Bizri is now working on several short films and a feature. He cites Henry James as a key figure in shaping some of his views on art and literature: “It is art that makes life, makes interest, makes importance… giving fresh meaning to contemporary life.”

On his website, Bizri lists the films he appreciates, including: "Arabic Series" (Stan Brakhage, 1981), "Red River" (Howard Hawks, 1946), "The Sun Shines Bright" (John Ford, 1953), "Au Hasard, Balthazar" (Robert Bresson, 1966), "Gertrud" (Carl Theodor Dreyer, 1964), "The 47 Ronin" (Kenji Mizoguchi, 1942), "The Earrings of Madame de..." (Max Ophuls, 1953), "India: Matri Bhumi" (Roberto Rossellini, 1959), The Tarnished Angels (Douglas Sirk, 1957), and "The Masseurs and a Woman" (Hiroshi Shimizu, 1938), as well as the films of D. W. Griffith and Gregory Markopoulos.

Personal life

Bizri met his wife, a philosopher, in 1986, and they married in 1993. The couple resided in Providence, RI with their daughter. They no longer live in Providence.

Filmography

Selected films

Awards and honors 
Best Director (Tarkovsky Award) for "Night Shift," Amarcord Arthouse Film & Video Festival (2017)
 Best Editing Award for "Beneath the wide, wide, Heaven," RAIIFA International Film Festival (2016)
 Salomon Faculty Research Award, Brown University (2015)
 Script Station, Berlinale Talent Campus, Berlin International Film Festival (2011)
 American Academy in Rome "Rome Prize" (2008)
 McKnight Media Artist Award (2008)
 Guggenheim Fellowship (2007)
 Rockefeller Foundation Bellagio Fellowship (2005)

References

External links
 
 

1966 births
Living people
American film directors
American film producers
American male screenwriters
American people of Lebanese descent
Brown University faculty
English-language film directors
Lebanese film directors
Massachusetts Institute of Technology faculty
University of Minnesota faculty
Screenwriters from Massachusetts
Screenwriters from Minnesota
Screenwriters from Rhode Island